H. Wayne Driggs (1902–1951) was the son of Howard R. Driggs and his wife Eva F. Driggs.

Driggs studied at the University of Utah and New York University.  He wrote the script used in the 1937 Hill Cumorah Pageant, which was the first year the pageant was produced.  He was a professor at NYU at that time.  Driggs' script, with only a few changes, would remain the script used in the Hill Cumorah Pageant until 1987.

In 1945 Driggs became the president of the institution that would latter be called Southern Utah University.  He was still in this position at the time of his death in 1951.

In 1934 Driggs had married Susan Elizabeth Swensen.  They had five children.

Sources

External links
The H. Wayne Driggs Papers
Driggs Foundation bio on the family
Find A Grave, database and images (https://www.findagrave.com : accessed 15 December 2017), memorial page for Howard Wayne Driggs (9 Mar 1902–20 Jul 1951), Find A Grave Memorial no. 76794, citing Pleasant Grove City Cemetery, Pleasant Grove, Utah County, Utah, USA ; Maintained by Brenda (contributor 47111878) . https://www.findagrave.com/memorial/76794/howard-wayne-driggs

1902 births
1951 deaths
H. Wayne
Latter Day Saints from New York (state)
Latter Day Saints from Utah
New York University alumni
New York University faculty
Southern Utah University faculty
University of Utah alumni